Private police in the United States are law enforcement bodies that are owned and or controlled by non-governmental entities such as security agencies or private corporations. There is a strong overlap between the work of police and security, given that they share the same goals, perform the same activities and cooperate with one another, and often the same individuals work in both fields simultaneously, with police moonlighting as security officers. The overlap is even more pronounced when the police are private. Thus, it can be hard to draw a line between what is a private policeman and what is a public police officer. Private investigation is extensively used to investigate workplace crime.

Perhaps the easiest distinction to draw between public and private police is by sponsorship (i.e. by government or by private entities). Thus, private companies to whom police work is contracted out by the government would still be considered public police, since they are funded by government, and private security officers would be considered private police. There is also sometimes a distinction made between voluntary policing supported by the state and vigilante forms of policing that do not have the support of the state.

Private security firms patrol industrial facilities, commercial establishments, office buildings, transportation facilities, recreational complexes, shopping districts, residential neighborhoods, military complexes, power plants, and prisons.

Examples
Depending on one's definition of private police, it can include firms to which the government contracts out police work (e.g. the 1975–1977 Oro Valley, Arizona-Rural/Metro contract, the 1980 Reminderville, Ohio-Corporate Security contract, the 1976 Indian Springs, Florida-Guardsmark contract, and the 1976 Buffalo Creek, West Virginia-Guardsmark contract). Or, they can be officers who contract with various firms to patrol the area, as in the case of the San Francisco Patrol Specials, which at one time had arrest powers. Private police services are sometimes called "Subscription-Based Patrol."

A specific type of private police is company police, such as the specialized railroad police. In some cases, private police are sworn in as government employees in order to ensure compliance with the law, as in the Kalamazoo, Michigan-Charles Services contract, which lasted 3 years. Private security firms in the U.S. employ more guards, patrol personnel and detectives than the U.S. federal, state and local governments combined, fulfilling many of the beat-patrol functions once thought central to the mission of public police. It has been argued that the private police market furnishes tangible evidence about what people want but are not receiving from public police.

In Michigan some Security officers and store detectives have merchant police arrest powers and a limited peace officer status.

In South Carolina, all Security Officers have the same authority and power as Sheriff Deputies.  Spring Valley HOA in Columbia, SC is a good example of this.  Private Officers respond to calls for service, make arrests and use blue lights and traffic radar.  They are Law Enforcement under state law, case law and AG's opinion, and are authorized by the state to issue Uniform Traffic Tickets to violators. Security Officers in some cases are also considered Police Officers.

In Boston, Massachusetts, more than 100 housing projects and low-income apartment buildings are patrolled by private security. Almost all of the privately operated housing projects contract companies that employ Special Police Officers that are licensed through the City of Boston. These Special Police Officers are trained through a Boston Police approved academy and have full arrest powers while on property. Boston Special Officers also are given the authority to issue Civil Citations through BPD issued citation books.

In Utah, if privately owned colleges or universities are certified by the commissioner of public safety, they are allowed to have a law enforcement agency with officers being granted the same law enforcement authority as any other public law enforcement agency (police department).

In Arizona, privately owned colleges that offer bachelor's degrees, and have at least one dormitory, may employ a security police force.  These officers have full police powers on the property of the University and must meet all certification and training requirements as established by the state.  The law also indemnifies the state of any liability associated with 'acting or failing to act', and instead, places the financial responsibility on the respective college or university.

In North Bend, Oregon, Pembina Pipeline, the Canadian fossil fuel company that owns the Jordan Cove Energy Project, is the sole source of funding for a unit of the police department, which has been trained to suppress protests.

In Cass County, Minnesota, Enbridge, a Canadian owner of the Line 3 Pipeline has paid for thousands of hours of police patrol time and for equipment.

History
By the late 1960s, the private security industry was growing at a recession-resistant rate of 10-15% annually. Estimates of the number of private guards, investigators, and so on ranged from 350,000 to 800,000. From 1976 to 1981, there was a 20% increase in calls for police service. Demand existed for nonroutine services, such as police checks of vacationers' homes, escorts for merchants making bank deposits, extra patrols at business closing times, and so on. Around that same time, many police departments were facing budget freezes or cuts, and the number of police employees per 1,000 population dropped 10 percent between 1975 and 1985. Police adopted differential responses to requests for services, deprioritizing investigation of "cold" burglaries and larcenies. Private firms were employed to fill the gap.  Private police and their clients have compiled extensive records on certain crimes, such as department store pilferage. By 1990, private police comprised three-quarters of all police officers in the United States. It has been suggested that the private sector of policing in the future may increasingly assume the role of the public guardian of society, leaving public policing to a more narrow role that focuses on personal violence.

Perceived advantages
There is evidence that private police can provide services more cheaply than public police. As of 2017, the cost of San Francisco's private patrol specials ranges from $50–60/hour, compared to $58/hour for an off-duty police officer. In Reminderville, Corporate Security outbid the Summit County Sheriff Department's offer to charge the community $180,000 per year for 45-minute response time emergency response service by offering a $90,000 contract for twice as many patrol cars and a 6-minute response time.

Another advantage that has been cited is that private police have a contractual responsibility to protect their customers. In Warren v. District of Columbia, the court found that public police have no such responsibility. Thus, they cannot be sued if they fail to respond to calls for help, for instance.

James F. Pastor addresses such disadvantages by analyzing a number of substantive legal and public policy issues which directly or indirectly relate to the provision of security services. These can be demonstrated by the logic of alternative or supplemental service providers. This is illustrated by the concept of "para-police." Para-police is another name for private police officers. Many public safety agencies use auxiliary police officers, who are part-time sworn police officers. Some also use reserve police officers, who are hired on an "as needed" basis, with limited police powers. These officers are typically called to duty for special details or events.  In contrast to auxiliary and reserve officers, private policing is a relatively new and growing phenomenon.

There are several key distinctions between these options. Briefly, the distinctions relate to the level of police powers associated with the officer, the training levels required for each officer, the funding sources for the service provision, and the contractual and liability exposures related to each supplemental arrangement. Each alternative or supplemental service has its own strengths and weaknesses. The use of private police, however, has particular appeal because property or business owners can directly contract for public safety services, thereby providing welcome relief for municipal budgets. Finally, private police functions can be flexible, depending upon the financial, organizational, political, and situational circumstances of the client.

Murray Rothbard notes, "police service is not 'free'; it is paid for by the taxpayer, and the taxpayer is very often the poor person himself. He may very well be paying more in taxes for police now than he would in fees to private, and far more efficient, police companies. Furthermore, the police companies would be tapping a mass market; with the economies of such a larger-scale market, police protection would undoubtedly be much cheaper."

Patrick Tinsley also notes that some consumers might benefit from free police service:

Perceived disadvantages
Ultimately, some people see the potential for a "dual system" of policing—one for the wealthy and one for the poor—and others see the provision of private security as the primary protective resource in contemporary America. Other issues that arise in private policing include those arising from searching private property, electronic eavesdropping, and private police access to public police records. Abuse of authority, false arrest, improper search and interrogation, and operating without a license have been cited as potential dangers.

See also
Privatization in criminal justice

References

 
Private police
Law enforcement in the United States
Privatization in the United States